The Irpin or Irpen is a river in Ukraine, a right tributary of the Dnieper River. Irpin city is one of the urban settlements beside the river.

The original confluence of the Irpin and the Dnieper is beneath the surface of the Kyiv Reservoir, which was formed by the dam for the Kyiv Hydroelectric Power Plant in the mid-1960s. The Irpin reaches the dam 6.5–7 meters below the level of the reservoir and electrical pumps raise it into the reservoir.

The lands around the Irpin were the heartland of Kyivan Rus, and the chronicles mention the river in connection with several important historic events, such as the Battle on the Irpin River of 1321 in which the Grand Duke of Lithuania Gediminas (Gedemin) allegedly gained control over the lands of what is now central Ukraine. The river also defended Kyiv from German invasion during World War II.

Prior to the creation of Soviet-era dams, the Irpin basin was a biodiverse wetland.  

In the first two days of the 2022 Russian invasion of Ukraine, the Ukrainian Armed Forces destroyed the three lower bridges over the river, north-west of Kyiv, to hinder the Russian advance on the city. The bridges were at the village of Demydiv (near Kyiv Reservoir) and two at Irpin city. Ukrainian troops also opened the Kozarovychi dam on the second day of the invasion, to flood the Irpin basin, including houses in Demydiv. The flooding effectively created a shallow lake that prevented Russian vehicles from advancing across it. Russian shelling later damaged the dam, which made it more difficult for the Ukrainians to drain the area after the Russians had withdrawn.

Ecologists argue that the dams should not be rebuilt and that the wetland should be protected and restored.

References

External links

Irpin
Rivers of Kyiv Oblast